Hisa-e-Awali Behsud is a district of Maidan Wardak Province, Afghanistan. The district has a Hazara majority resident population, but the district is also used as grazing ground by nomadic Pashtun Kuchis. The Hajigak Mine is located in the district.

Since 2007 there has been a flare-up in ethnic violence in the district, emanating from a dispute between Hazaras and Kuchis over the ownership of vast tracts of land, with the Hazara claiming Kuchi militias are being armed by the Taliban. Several villages have been burned and thousands have had to flee the area.

See also 
 Markazi Bihsud District
 Behsud, Maidan Wardak

Sources 

 
 

Hazarajat
Districts of Maidan Wardak Province